The Miss Nicaragua 2018 pageant, was held on March 22, 2018 in Managua, after several weeks of events. At the conclusion of the final night of competition,  Adriana Paniagua from Chinandega won the title. She represented
Nicaragua at Miss Universe 2018.  The rest of the finalists would enter different pageants.

Placements

Special Awards

 Miss Photogenic - Villanueva - Belén Espinales
 Best Smile - Chinandega - Adriana Paniagua
 Best Hair - Chinandega - Adriana Paniagua
 Miss Attitute - Jinotega - Dayrin Talavera

.

Official Contestants

.

Judges

 Waskar Medal - Executive Director at Charmante Ecole, NY

 Sandra Rios - Miss Earth Nicaragua 2005

 Maria Gabriela Castillo - Marketing Manager of APEN (Association of Producers and Exporters of Nicaragua)

 Ligia de Kosh -  Regional Manager of Firenze Shampoo

 Jeannette Duque-Estrada - President of Serlisa Group

 Julio Rosales - Professional Photographer

 Belgica Suarez De Plasencia - Fashion Designer

 Reina Gonzalez de Ordoñez -  Associate Partner of KPMG US, LLP

.

Background Music

Opening Show – Evenor Gonzalez - "Mi belleza, Mi Fuerza".

References

Miss Nicaragua
2018 in Nicaragua
2018 beauty pageants